Persia praecox is a species of phillipsiid proetid trilobite from Tournaisian-aged marine strata in what is now Eastern Iran.

Etymology
The generic name refers to "Persia," the old name of Iran, the country where the type specimen was found.  The specific name refers to how it is the earliest known and most primitive phillipsiid of the subfamily Cummingellinae, i.e., that it is the progenitor of Cummingellinae.

References 

Carboniferous trilobites
Philipsidae
Proetida genera